Loyalist Golf and Country Club is a Ted Baker-designed semi-private golf course, located in Bath, Ontario, Canada, just west of Kingston, Ontario. It plays as a par 72, with 5 sets of tee blocks, and yardages ranging from 5,038 to 6,625 yards.

Tournaments, champions, and notable players

Loyalist Golf Club has been the site of several major provincial and local events, including the Ontario Senior Men's Amateur (August 2011), the Ontario Women's Mid-Amateur (August 2010), the Ontario Men's Mid-Amateur (June 2009), the GAO Senior Women's Amateur (July 2008), and the Women's Amateur (2012) championships.

CN Future Links championship
The CN Future Links championship was held at Loyalist, May 24 - 27, 2012. Anna Kim of Toronto and Matt Williams of Calgary captured their respective Junior Girls and Junior Boys titles. Williams finished with a 6-under par round of 66, for a tournament total of 3-under 213. Local favourites Josh Whalen of Napanee, and Austin James of Bath finished in a tie for fourth with a 1-over par scores of 217.

The Loyalist Cup
Each year, since the inaugural event in 2000, the club holds the Loyalist Cup tournament, a team match-play competition, using a format similar to the Ryder Cup.

External links
 Loyalist Golf and Country Club (http://www.loyalistcc.com)
 Golf Association of Ontario (http://www.gao.ca)

Golf clubs and courses in Ontario